Lucki  is an American rapper and record producer from Chicago, Illinois

Lucki may also refer to:
Lucki Stipetić,  German film producer
Łucki (surname), Polish-language surname

See also